Stefano Serchinic (28 October 1929 - 2 July 2010) was a Yugoslav-born Italian male racewalker who competed at the 1960 Summer Olympics.

See also
 Italian team at the running events
 Italy at the IAAF World Race Walking Cup

References

External links
 

1929 births
2010 deaths
Athletes (track and field) at the 1960 Summer Olympics
Italian male racewalkers
Olympic athletes of Italy
Italian people of Croatian descent